Atkins Peak, elevation , is a mountain peak in the eastern section of the Absaroka Range in Yellowstone National Park, in the U.S. state of Wyoming.

See also
 Mountains and mountain ranges of Yellowstone National Park

Notes

Mountains of Wyoming
Mountains of Yellowstone National Park
Mountains of Park County, Wyoming